Playing It Straight is an American reality television series broadcast by the Fox Broadcasting Company (Fox). The series premiered on March 12, 2004, although it was quickly cancelled with its third episode being the last to air on March 26, 2004. Filmed in Elko, Nevada, the series followed Jackie, a single, straight college student, as she searched for love among a group of 14 men. This group, however, consisted of a mix between straight and gay men. Each week Jackie went on individual dates with the men in order to determine if they were straight or gay. Each week Jackie was required to eliminate two men who she believed to be gay from the competition. If the final contestant was a straight man, he and Jackie would split a $1,000,000 reward; If the final contestant was a gay man, he would solely receive the $1,000,000. The series was hosted by American television presenter Daphne Brogdon.

Format
Filmed in Elko, Nevada at the Sizzling Saddle Ranch, the series followed Jackie, a college student from Wisconsin, as she selected a suitor among a group of fourteen men. This group, however, comprised a mix between straight and gay men; all of the gay men attempted to pass as straight. In an effort to discern which men were gay, Jackie participated in group activities and went on individual dates with all of the suitors. At the end of each episode, Jackie was required to eliminate two suitors who she believed to be gay. If the final suitor was a straight man, he and Jackie would split a $1,000,000 reward, however, if the final suitor was a gay man, he alone would receive the reward. The series was hosted by American television presenter Daphne Brogdon.

Production
Production for Playing It Straight began in mid-2003 under the working title Who Will She Choose? The concept for the series originated in the United Kingdom, although it was ultimately sold to Fox. According to executive producer Adam Wood, the series was conceptualized as a version of The Bachelor with a "slightly absurd" twist. Variety initially reported that the series was a potential cover for a new season of the reality dating show Joe Millionaire.

Episodes

Reception
Playing It Straight received generally unfavorable reviews from television critics. Dana Stevens of Slate criticized the series for portraying gay men as "romantic pariahs." She further commented: "[N]ot only is Playing It Straight ideologically offensive, it’s also colossally boring."

Ratings
The series started off with decent ratings, in which its premiere episode received 5.3 million viewers. It was the highest-rated program of the night among several demographics, including adults 18-34, persons 12-34, teens and men 18-34.

Cancellation
On March 29, 2004, Fox announced the series' removal from the network's schedule due to poor ratings of its three aired episodes. Despite this removal, the network affirmed that they intended to air the five remaining episodes at some point during the summer season. Following this announcement, Playing It Straight was replaced on the Fox schedule with reruns of Totally Outrageous Behavior and World's Craziest Videos. On May 21, 2004, Fox's entertainment president Gail Berman announced that the series was cancelled, although she claimed that the network would provide "any viewer that needs the information with the information of the conclusion." Two months later, Fox posted synopses of the unaired episodes on their website, in which it was revealed that Jackie chose a straight man and thus won the $500,000 reward. On January 17, 2005, Fox published the entire series on their website, in which users could download the individual episodes on a pay-per-view basis. Despite the network's claims, Jackie disputed the reason for the series' cancellation. She stated: "I can’t say it was cancelled due to ratings. It aired on Fridays, and no shows have been successful on Fridays ... [Fox] blamed it on the ratings, but I think it may have been something deeper."

The mid-season cancellation of Playing It Straight had an impact on other LGBT-related programming. Seriously, Dude, I'm Gay, another Fox produced LGBT-related reality television special, was set to air on June 7, 2004, although it was abruptly removed from the Fox schedule only eleven days before its airdate. An "insider" at Fox claimed that the underperformance of Playing It Straight was a significant factor in the special's cancellation, as it caused the network to "believe the gay reality phenomenon was on the wane." The producers of the TBS series He's a Lady viewed Playing It Straight—in addition to Boy Meets Boy and Seriously, Dude, I'm Gay—as an example of the "potential pitfalls" to avoid when producing an LGBT-themed show. The underperformance and cancellations of these series resulted in executive producers Douglas Ross and Tommy Campbell consulting GLAAD for review of He's a Lady.

Results

Aftermath
Fox aired only three episodes before pulling the show from its schedule.

In 2005, nearly one year later after the show was recorded, Fox issued a press release stating that Jackie and Banks were still together.  After the show, Jackie and Banks dated for about two years.  For the first eight months, they had to keep their relationship quiet until the show aired.  Banks went so far as to tell friends that he had to leave the show because he broke his arm, rather than reveal he won.

In 2007, Fox Reality reaired the series paired with "Reality Revealed" interviews of the contestants at each commercial break.

Seven Network (Australia)

An Australian version of the show aired on the Seven Network starting October 2004 hosted by Natalie Garonzi. Despite much of the hype surrounding it the shows ratings dwindled and it was moved to a later timeslot. After Rebecca eliminated Campbell (who was gay) Chad, Dane and Evan were left for one non-elimination round before appearing in the final episode. Rebecca chose Chad and he was revealed to be straight.

The Australian show has also aired in the US on FOX Reality. Rebecca and Chad are no longer together.

Contestants

UK version

Series 1 (2005)
The first UK version started on April 8, 2005, as part of their Twisted Dating Season. The series was set on a Mexican ranch and Zoe Hardman is spending time with 12 men.  Ten men started the show and two more, Lee and Marco, were added in week 3 - it was revealed when they arrived that one was gay and one was straight. The prize money was £100,000 and the show was hosted by June Sarpong. The series has been repeated on Channel 4's sister channel, 4Music.

Early reporting revealed Ben Harris to be Mr Gay UK and also said: "Ben Harris, a builder, looks to be one of the favourites to win the show after the first episode in which he played to the builder stereotype."

Contestants

The Girl: Zoe Hardman

Notes

In week three, Lee was not allowed to reveal his sexuality on being voted off, in order that Marco's sexual orientation stayed secret.
In week five, Alex won the contest to dress Zoe and received a dinner date with her.  On their date, Alex decided to confess to Zoe that he was gay, as a result of which she eliminated him that week.
Zoe picked Ben and it was then revealed that he was gay. Ben offered Zoe the prize money, and she decided to split it evenly with him. She stated that even though he was gay she was still glad she chose him.

Series 2 (2012)
In October 2011, it was announced that Channel 4 had ordered a full second series. This time the location was set in Spain and the new series was hosted by T4 presenter, Jameela Jamil and comedian Alan Carr provided the narration. The prize fund was decreased 50% to £50,000 (£25,000 each). The second series made its debut on 9 January 2012 at 9pm on E4. The series was set at a Spanish hacienda - Hacienda de los Hombres. The series was also aired on Channel 4's teen-strand, T4 on Saturdays.

Contestants

The Girl: Cara

Notes

Contestants Jordan and Mitch were introduced in Week 4.
Dean was chosen as the winner. As he was straight, both he and Cara won £25,000 each.

Transmissions

Herken De Homo (The Netherlands)
The original FOX version was a surprise hit on Dutch television, prompting RTL Nederland to create its own version in 2005, it aired on RTL 5 at the time.

In Herken de Homo (Recognize the Gay) hosted by Fiona Hering, 23 year old Nathalie Biermanns was sent to Mexico. She had to choose between 14 men. At the end, only Marcel remained who turned out to be straight. Both won 50,000 Euro each.

See also
Seriously, Dude, I'm Gay – another scrapped Fox reality show with a similar premise.
Boy Meets Boy - A dating series with an identical premise, but the central person was a gay man with gay and straight suitors.

References

Sources

External links
  at the Wayback Machine
 

2000s American reality television series
2004 American television series debuts
2004 American television series endings
2000s American LGBT-related television series
Fox Broadcasting Company original programming
2000s Australian reality television series
American dating and relationship reality television series
Channel 4 original programming
2000s British LGBT-related television series
2005 British television series debuts
American LGBT-related reality television series
2000s LGBT-related reality television series